Charles Bell (1774–1842) was a Scottish anatomist, surgeon, physiologist and natural theologian.

Charles or Charlie Bell may also refer to:

Arts and entertainment
 Charles Bell (British architect) (1846–1899), British architect
 Charles Milton Bell (1848–1893), American photographer
 Charles E. Bell (1858–1932), American architect
 Charlie Bell (clown) (1886–1964), American circus clown
 Charles Bell (painter) (1935–1995), American photorealist painter

Politics and law
 Charles Bell (British politician) (1805–1869), British Member of Parliament for the City of London
 Charles H. Bell (politician) (1823–1893), American lawyer and politician from New Hampshire
 Charles J. Bell (politician) (1845–1909), American politician; governor of Vermont
 Charles K. Bell (1853–1913), U.S. Representative from Texas
 Charles M. Bell (1840–1893), American lawyer and politician from New York
 Charles W. Bell (1857–1927), U.S. Representative from California
 Charles Alfred Bell (1870–1945), British political officer in India
 Charles William Bell (1876–1938), Canadian lawyer, Member of Parliament, and playwright
 Charles S. Bell (1880–1965), American lawyer and judge in Ohio
 C. Jasper Bell (1885–1978), U.S. Representative from Missouri

Sports
 Charlie Bell (baseball) (1868–1937), American baseball player
 Charlie Bell (footballer, born 1894) (1894–1939), Scottish footballer and manager
 Lefty Bell (Charles Bell, fl. 1948), American baseball player
 Charlie Bell (footballer, born 1958), English footballer (Middlesbrough FC)
 Charlie Bell (basketball) (born 1979), American basketball player
 Charlie Bell (footballer, born 2002), English footballer

Others
 Charles H. Bell (naval officer) (1798–1875), U.S. Navy officer during the War of 1812 and the First Barbary War
 Charles Davidson Bell (1813–1882), Scottish surveyor general in the Cape Colony, artist and designer of stamps
 Charles J. Bell (businessman) (1858–1929), Irish-American financier and businessman
 Charles Gordon Bell (1889–1918), British pilot in World War I
 Charles Frederic Moberly Bell, British journalist and newspaper editor
 Charles Greenleaf Bell, scholar, poet and writer
 Charlie Bell (businessman) (1960–2005), Australian businessman; CEO of McDonald's Corporation